Marciano is both a given name and a surname.

Marciano can also refer to:

 Léo Marciano, French luxury fashion house founded in 1970 by the eponymous designer Léo Marciano
 Marciano Stores, an American clothing line, owned by Guess? Inc.
 Marciano della Chiana, municipality in the Province of Arezzo, in the Italian region Tuscany
 Battle of Marciano (also known as the Battle of Scannagallo), in Marciano della Chiana, Tuscany, in 1554
 Rocky Marciano (film), 1999 TV-film presented by MGM
 Marciano, a 1979 TV movie directed by Bernard L. Kowalski
 Roque Marciano, album by Brazilian rock band, Detonautas